Daata is a 1989 Indian Hindi-language action drama film directed by Sultan Ahmed, starring Mithun Chakraborty, Shammi Kapoor, Padmini Kolhapure, Suresh Oberoi, Supriya Pathak, Amrish Puri, Ranjeet, Deepak Parashar, Shafi Inamdar, Saeed Jaffrey and Bharat Bhushan. This movie was average in big cities, but in small cities and in north India, it was a big hit. "Daata" remains for Mithun Chakraborty one of his best performances till date.

Plot
Dinanath is a school-teacher in a small town in India, and lives with his wife, Kamla; daughter, Shanti; and son Kundan. He has published a book called "Daata", in which he has made reference to all major religions of the world, and is honored for this contribution by none other than the President of India through the Education Minister, Raja Suraj Singh. He arranges the marriage of Shanti to the son of Gopaldas; when Gopaldas demands dowry, he is unable to afford this, and states that he has given sufficient gold and jewellery to Shanti. The gold turns out to be fake; as a result, the marriage is cancelled, Shanti kills herself, Dinanath dies of a heart attack. His name is tarnished, no one comes forward to help Kundan or his mother. Kundan decides to avenge his father's death by killing Gopaldas' son; as a result, he becomes a bandit, joins a band of other bandits and is on the look-out to kill Gopaldas. The question remains; is this what Dinanath had foreseen for his son - a life of a bandit, and death at the hands of the police?

Cast

 Mithun Chakraborty as Kundan Singh
 Shammi Kapoor as DIG Sher (Sheroo) Ali Khan
 Padmini Kolhapure as Sona Prasad
 Pallavi Joshi as Shanti Singh
 Suresh Oberoi as Ramzan Khan 
 Supriya Pathak as Suraiya Khan / Suraiya Rauf Khan
 Amrish Puri as Gopal Das (G.D.) Sarang / Gopi 
 Prem Chopra as Lala Naagraj (Nagi) 
 Ranjeet as Natwar Sarang 
 Saeed Jaffrey as Master Dinanath (Dinu) Singh 
 Deepak Parashar as Inspector Rauf Khan
 Shoma Anand as Alka Naagraj 
 Arjun as Kundan's Friend
 Bharat Bhushan as Pandit Dwarka Prasad, Father of Sona Prasad
 Birbal as Veeru
 Jamuna as Seema Suraj Singh
 Anil Dhawan as Kundan's Friend
 Satyendra Kapoor as Barkat Khan, Father of Ramzan Khan
 Raj Mehra as Jamuna's Husband 
 Leela Mishra as Jamuna 
 Mac Mohan as Kundan's Friend
 Mukri as Pandit Ram Prasad
 Jayshree Arora as Kamla Dinanath Singh
 Tom Alter as Pat 
 Arun Bakshi as Inspector Sharma 
 Brahm Bhardwaj as School Principal
 Kamal Kapoor as  Panna Seth Smuggler 
Keshav Rana as Dhaniram , Smuggler
 Viju Khote as Thief
 Roopesh Kumar as G.D.'S Employee
 Arjun Sarja as Kundan's Friend
 Girja Shankar as Bheema
 Om Shivpuri as Education Minister Raja Suraj Singh
 Bhushan Tiwari as Jango, G.D.'S Employee
 Ashalata Wabgaonkar as Ratanbai

Music
Lyrics were written by Anjaan, Indeevar and Asad Bhopali.
"Daata Tere Kai Naam, Koi Pukare Kisi Naam Se Aaye Tu Sabke Kaam" - Mahendra Kapoor, Sadhana Sargam, Manhar Udhas
"Rona Dhona Chhod Chhod De, Hum Se Naata Jodh Jodhde" - Kishore Kumar, Alka Yagnik
"Naach Mere Lala" - Sapna Mukherjee, Nalin Dave
"Holi Khelein Nand Laal, Laal Khele Holi Kanha Ne Mari Aise Pichkari" - Sapna Mukherjee, Nalin Dave
"Teri Meri Yaari Yeh Dosti Hamari, Bhagwan Ko Pasand Hai Allah Ko Hai Pyari" - Suresh Wadkar, Mohammed Aziz
"Meri Jaan Pyar Karo, Pyar Hi Pyar Karo Pyare" - Asha Bhosle
"Daata Tere Kai Naam, Koi Pukare Kisi Naam Se Aaye Tu Sabke Kaam" (version 2) - Mahendra Kapoor, Sadhana Sargam, Manhar Udhas
"Baabul Ka Yeh Ghar Behana" - Kishore Kumar, Alka Yagnik
"Baabul Kaa Ye Ghar Behana" (Sad) - Kishore Kumar, Alka Yagnik
"Daata Tere Kai Naam, Koi Pukare Kisi Naam Se Aaye Tu Sabke Kaam" (version 2) - Sadhana Sargam, Manhar Udhas

Box office
The film was a super hit and the fifth highest-grossing movie of 1989.

References

 http://www.bollywoodhungama.com/movies/cast/5262/index.html
 http://ibosnetwork.com/asp/filmbodetails.asp?id=Daata

External links
 
 Daata at AllMovie

1989 films
1980s action drama films
1980s Hindi-language films
Films scored by Kalyanji Anandji
Indian action drama films
Films about social issues in India
1989 crime drama films